"Eve's Diary" is a comic short story by Mark Twain. 
It was first published in the 1905 Christmas issue of the magazine Harper's Bazaar, in book format as one contribution to a volume entitled "Their Husband's Wives" and then in June 1906 as a standalone book by Harper and Brothers publishing house.

Summary
It is written in the style of a diary kept by the first woman in the biblical creation story, Eve, and is claimed to be "translated from the original MS."  The "plot" of this story is the first-person account of Eve from her creation up to her burial by her mate Adam, including meeting and getting to know him, and exploring the world around her, Eden.  The story then jumps 40 years into the future after the Fall and expulsion from Eden. 

It is one of a series of books Twain wrote concerning the story of Adam and Eve, including Extracts from Adam's Diary, 'That Day In Eden,' 'Eve Speaks,' 'Adam's Soliloquy,' and the 'Autobiography of Eve.'  "Eve's Diary" has a lighter tone than the others in the series, as Eve has a strong appreciation for beauty and love.  

The book may have been written as a posthumous love-letter to Mark Twain's wife Olivia Langdon Clemens, or Livy, who died in June 1904, just before the story was written.  Mark Twain is quoted as saying, "'Eve's Diary' is finished — I've been waiting for her to speak, but she doesn't say anything more."  The story ends with Adam lamenting at Eve's grave, "Wheresoever she was, there was Eden."

Illustrations
The book version of the story was published with 55 illustrations by Lester Ralph, on each left hand page. The illustrations depicted Eve and Adam in their natural settings. The depiction of an unclothed woman was considered pornographic when the book was first released in the United States, and created a controversy around the book. A library in Charlton, Massachusetts banned the book for the depictions of Eve in "summer costume."

When contacted Twain replied:

Two weeks later, after testifying before Congress, he elaborated as reported in the Washington Herald, 

 
In a handwritten inscription in the front of at least one copy of the book, he wrote:

 
And in a letter to a friend, Harriett E. Whitmore, he commented:

Gallery

Stage adaptation
David Birney adapted the novel into a play called Mark Twain's The Diaries of Adam and Eve.

References

External links
 Full text of book, without illustrations
 Full text of book, with all of Lester Ralph's illustrations (Project Gutenberg)
 
 New York Times article on Massachusetts banning
  Michael Waisman webpage on book, including one illustration and excerpt
 Review of reprint of Excerpt of Adams Diary and Eve's Diary
 Excerpt from Washington Herald article
 Excerpt from letter to Harriett E. Whitmore
 https://books.google.com/books?id=4_KcPtlambsC&printsec=frontcover&source=gbs_ge_summary_r&cad=0#v=onepage&q&f=false 
 http://www.loyalbooks.com/book/eves-diary-by-mark-twain

1905 short stories
Fictional diaries
Short stories by Mark Twain
Comic short stories
Works originally published in Harper's Bazaar
Harper & Brothers books
Cultural depictions of Adam and Eve
Obscenity controversies in literature

no:Den tvilsomme tvilling